Banco Español del Río de la Plata (in English: Spanish Bank of the Río de la Plata) was an Argentine bank which operated in Buenos Aires between 1886 and 1983.

History 

The Bank was founded in 1886 by Augusto J. Coelho, born in Montevideo, Uruguay. This entity was also in charge of Jorge A. Mitchell, who served as Manager of The Banco Español and Río de la Plata for several years.

Originally its building was located on the Calle de la Piedad (current Bartolomé Mitre), neighborhood of San Nicolás. In 1905 a new building was built by the architect Carlos Agote, located at the intersections of Reconquista and Cangallo (Buenos Aires). Its original headquarters was acquired by Banco Galicia in 1988, who demolished the original building in 2001.

The Banco Español del Río de la Plata had branches in several European cities, including Barcelona, Madrid (Caryatid Building) and London. It was merged with the Banco Comercial del Norte in 1983.

References 

Banks established in 1886
Defunct banks of Argentina
Río de la Plata
Buildings and structures in Buenos Aires